Ch'illiwani (Aymara ch'illiwa a species of grass (Festuca dolichophylla), -ni a suffix, "the one with the ch'illiwa grass", also spelled Chillihuani) is a mountain in the Bolivian Andes which reaches a height of approximately . It is located in the Cochabamba Department, Ayopaya Province, Ayopaya Municipality. Ch'illiwani lies southwest of Kuntur Chukuña.

References 

Mountains of Cochabamba Department